Notholaena (from Ancient Greek νόθο(ς) + χλαῖνα), cloak fern, is a genus of ferns in the Cheilanthoideae subfamily of the Pteridaceae. Ferns of this genus are mostly epipetric (growing on rock) or occurring in coarse, gravelly soils, and are most abundant and diverse in the mountain ranges of warm arid or semiarid regions.  They typically have a creeping or erect rhizome and leaves that are pinnatifid to pinnate-pinnatifid with marginal sori protected by a false indusium formed from the reflexed margin of the leaf.  Members of Notholaena also have a coating of whitish or yellowish farina (a powdery secretion that prevents desiccation) on the surfaces of the leaves.  The farina is often limited to the abaxial (lower) leaf surface, but may occur on the adaxial (upper) leaf surface as well. Members of the related Pentagramma genus have a similar lower leaf-surface farina.

The similar genus Argyrochosma also has farinose leaves, but in that genus the ultimate segments of the leaves have entire margins and *are distinctly stalked, whereas in Notholaena the ultimate segments are usually lobed or pinnatifid and sessile or subsessile. Notholaena has in the past been used as a "catch-all" genus for a wide variety of species that did not fit well in other arid fern genera but it has more recently been defined in a much narrower sense, making the genus much more morphologically and evolutionarily coherent. The genera Argyrochosma and Astrolepis were recently segregated from Notholaena, and other former members of Notholaena are now in the genus Cheilanthes.

Species 
, the Checklist of Ferns and Lycophytes of the World recognized the following species:

Notholaena affinis (Mett.) T.Moore
Notholaena aliena Maxon
Notholaena aschenborniana Klotzsch
Notholaena aurantiaca Eaton
Notholaena aureolina Yatsk. & Arbeláez
Notholaena brachycaulis Mickel
Notholaena brachypus (Kunze) J.Sm.
Notholaena brevistipes Mickel
Notholaena buchtienii Rosenst.
Notholaena californica D.C.Eaton
Notholaena candida (M.Martens & Galeotti) Hook.
Notholaena cantangensis R.M.Tryon
Notholaena cubensis Weath. ex R.M.Tryon
Notholaena ekmanii Maxon
Notholaena eriophora Fée
Notholaena fraseri (Mett.) Baker
Notholaena galapagensis Weath. & Svenson ex Svenson
Notholaena galeottii Fée
Notholaena geraniifolia St.-Hil. ex Weath.
Notholaena goyazensis Taub.
Notholaena grayi Davenp.
Notholaena greggii (Mett. ex Kuhn) Maxon
Notholaena hassleri Weath.
Notholaena hieronymi (Herter) comb. ined.
Notholaena hypoleuca Kunze
Notholaena jacalensis Pray
Notholaena jaliscana Yatsk. & Arbeláez
Notholaena lemmonii D.C.Eaton
Notholaena leonina Maxon
Notholaena meridionalis Mickel
Notholaena mollis Kunze
Notholaena montielae Yatsk. & Arbeláez
Notholaena neglecta Maxon
Notholaena nigricans (Willd.) Desv.
Notholaena obducta (Mett.) Baker
Notholaena ochracea (Hook.) Yatsk. & Arbeláez
Notholaena pohliana Kunze
Notholaena revoluta A.Rojas
Notholaena rigida Davenp.
Notholaena rosei Maxon
Notholaena schaffneri (E.Fourn.) Underw.
Notholaena solitaria R.M.Tryon
Notholaena standleyi (Kümmerle) Maxon
Notholaena sulphurea (Cav.) J.Sm.
Notholaena trichomanoides (L.) R.Br.
Notholaena venusta Brade
Notholaena weatherbiana R.M.Tryon

References

External links
Tree of Life: notholaenids

 
Fern genera